Mieczysław Stefan Wilczewski (30 October 1932 – 8 December 1993) was a Polish cyclist. He competed at the 1960 Summer Olympics in the 100 km team time trial and finished in 10th place. He won the Tour de Pologne in 1953. That same year he was awarded the Silver Cross of Merit by the Polish government for his accomplishment. In the 1970s he emigrated to the United States, and he died in Cocoa Beach, Florida in 1993.

References

External links

1932 births
1993 deaths
Cyclists at the 1960 Summer Olympics
Olympic cyclists of Poland
Polish male cyclists
Polish emigrants to the United States
People from Zdolbuniv